Mark James McGuinness (born 5 January 2001) is a professional footballer who plays as a centre back for Cardiff City. Born in England, McGuiness represents the Republic of Ireland at youth international level.

Club career
Born in Slough, McGuinness joined Arsenal at the age of 10. After featuring regularly for Arsenal's under-18s side during the 2018–19 season, he signed his first professional contract with the club in April 2019. He broke into Arsenal's under-23 squad during the 2019–20 season, although he missed much of the season through injury. He featured for the Arsenal first-team for the first time during pre-season for the 2020–21 season, including scoring a header in a 4–1 win over Milton Keynes Dons in a friendly on 25 August.

McGuinness signed on a season long loan for Ipswich Town in September 2020. He made his senior debut on 27 October 2020, keeping a clean sheet in a 1–0 win over Gillingham. He scored his first senior career goal in a 1–0 away win over Burton Albion on 16 January 2021. McGuinness made 25 appearances during his loan spell at Ipswich, scoring once.

He signed for Cardiff City on 21 June 2021, on a three-year contract. He scored his first goal for Cardiff in a 2-1 win against Preston North End on 20 November 2021.

On 18 August 2022, McGuinness joined Sheffield Wednesday on a season-long loan. Two days later he made his debut, starting against Bolton Wanderers. He would win the clubs player of the month for November, making five appearances and scoring his first goal for the club against Shrewsbury Town. Another three clean sheets from a possible five in December saw him get back-to-back player of the month awards at the club. He was recalled back to Cardiff City on 19 January 2023 having played 23 times.

International career
McGuinness is a Republic of Ireland youth international, qualifying through his Derry-born father (who grew up in Limavady) and playing for them at under-19 level. He made his debut for the Republic of Ireland under-19 side in March 2019 in a 5–0 win over Romania U19.

He received his first call-up to the Republic of Ireland under-21 team in November 2020, for UEFA Under-21 European Championship Qualifiers at home to Iceland and away to Luxembourg. He made his debut for the under-21s in a 2–1 win over Luxembourg on 18 November. McGuinness scored his first goal for the U21's on 12 October 2021 in a 2–1 loss to Montenegro in Podgorica.

Personal life
Mark's father, John McGuinness and brother Tom have represented England in bowls.

Career statistics

References

External links

2001 births
Living people
Republic of Ireland association footballers
Republic of Ireland youth international footballers
Republic of Ireland under-21 international footballers
English footballers
English people of Irish descent
Association football defenders
Arsenal F.C. players
Ipswich Town F.C. players
Cardiff City F.C. players
Sheffield Wednesday F.C. players
English Football League players